London is divided into 32 boroughs and the City of London. As there are 16,197 Grade II listed buildings in London they have been split into separate lists for each borough.

See also
 Grade I listed buildings in London
 Grade II* listed buildings in London
 :Category:Grade II listed buildings in London

References
National Heritage List for England

 
London